Charles William Dyke  (born 28 July 1935) is a retired lieutenant general in the United States Army whose assignments included commander of United States Army Japan and IX Corps from 1985 to 1988, and of the 8th Infantry Division (Mechanized) in Europe from 1983 to 1985.

Dyke enlisted in the Army on 21 June 1954 and was commissioned as a second lieutenant of infantry on 25 June 1955 upon graduation from Officer Candidate School. He later completed a B.A. degree in history at the University of Southern Mississippi in 1963, a Master of Military Arts and Science degree at the Army Command and General Staff College in 1967 and an M.A. degree in international affairs at George Washington University in 1968. Dyke is also a graduate of the Army War College.

Dyke commanded the 2nd Battalion, 327th Infantry, 101st Airborne Division in Vietnam, earning two Silver Star Medals, three Bronze Star Medals, the Purple Heart and eighteen Air Medals. He later commanded the 1st Battalion, 101st Airborne Division (Air Assault) at Fort Campbell and served as assistant commander of the 3rd Infantry Division (Mechanized) in Europe.

Dyke retired from active duty on 1 September 1988. He was inducted into the U.S. Army Ranger Hall of Fame in 2007.

References

1935 births
Living people
People from Covington, Georgia
United States Army soldiers
University of Southern Mississippi alumni
United States Army Rangers
United States Army Command and General Staff College alumni
Elliott School of International Affairs alumni
United States Army personnel of the Vietnam War
Recipients of the Air Medal
Recipients of the Soldier's Medal
Recipients of the Silver Star
United States Army War College alumni
Recipients of the Legion of Merit
United States Army generals
Recipients of the Defense Superior Service Medal